The following is a list of Wales national rugby team results since 1908

Overall

1900s

1910s

1920s

1930s

1940s

1950s

1960s

1970s

1980s

1990s

2000s

2010s

2020s

See also

Rugby league in Wales
List of Wales national rugby league team players
Wales national rugby league team
Wales A (Dragonhearts)
Wales women's national rugby league team

Sources 
 international results website

External links
Wales results at rugbyleagueproject.org

Rugby league in Wales
Rugby league-related lists
Wales national rugby league team